M-DISC (Millennial Disc) is a write-once optical disc technology introduced in 2009 by Millenniata, Inc.and available as DVD and Blu-ray discs.

Overview 
M-DISC's design is intended to provide archival media longevity. M-Disc claims that properly stored M-DISC DVD recordings will last up to 1000 years. The M-DISC DVD looks like a standard disc, except it is slightly thicker and almost transparent with later DVD & BD-R M-Disks having standard and inkjet printable labels.

M-Discs are readable by most regular DVD players made after 2005 and Blu-Ray & BDXL disc drives and writable by most made after 2011.

Available recording capacities conform to standard DVD/Blu-ray sizes: 4.7 GB DVD-R to 25 GB BD-R, 50 GB BD-R and 100 GB BDXL.

History 
M-DISC developer Millenniata, Inc. was co-founded by Brigham Young University professors Barry Lunt, Matthew Linford, CEO Henry O'Connell and CTO Doug Hansen. The company was incorporated on May 13, 2010, in American Fork, Utah.

Millenniata, Inc. officially went bankrupt in December 2016.  Under the direction of CEO Paul Brockbank, Millenniata had issued convertible debt.  When the obligation for conversion was not satisfied, the company defaulted on the debt payment and the debt holders took possession of all of the company's assets.  The debt holders subsequently started a new company, Yours.co, to sell M-DISCs and related services.

As of the 2020's there are only 2 licensed manufactures' M-Discs, Ritek sold under the Ritek and M-DISC brands and Verbatim produces co-branded discs, marketed as the "Verbatim M-DISC".

128 GB BDXL never made it to market due to the 2016 bankruptcy.

Durability claims 
M-Disk passed the testing standards of both ISO/IEC 10995:2011 & ECMA-379 .

With a projected rated lifespan of several hundred years in archival use.

Due to glassy carbon layers, in theory if preserved correctly in an environment like a salt mine for example, the actual data could last for over 10,000 years before going outside of readable spec, however due to the polycarbonate plastics which are commonly used by almost all optical media and heavily in CBRN and ballistic protective equipment due to its well-known optical, physical impact & chemical resistant properties, the discs only have a relative lifespan rating of 1000 years before plastic degradation.

Durability testing 
In 2009, testing was done by the US Department of Defense (DOD) producing the China Lake Report testing Millenniata's M-Disk DVD to current market offerings from Delkin, MAM-A, Mitsubishi, Taiyo Yuden and Verbatim with all bands using organic dyes failing to pass the series of accelerated aging tests.

In 2012 (2010-2012), the French National Laboratory of Metrology and Testing (LNE) used high-temperature accelerated aging testing, at 90 °C (194 °F) and 85% relative humidity inside a CLIMATS Excal 5423-U, for 250~1000 hours with a mix of in-organic DVD+R discs from MPO, Verbatim, Maxwell, Syylex & DataTresor, summary of the tests states Syylex GlassMasterDisc was rated for 1000+ hours, DataTresorDisc 250 hours+ & M-Disk under 250 hours. 

In 2016, a consumer Mol Smith did real world stress testing on the 25GB BD-R M-Disc alongside TDK's standard BD-R 25GB disc, which demonstrated the reliability of M-Disc's molding compared to standard discs; after 60 days of outdoor direct exposure the M-Disk was verified without error, while the TDK disc was physically destroyed.

In 2022, the NIST Interagency Report NIST IR 8387(Page 12), stated that M-Disc is an acceptable archival format rated for up to 100 years+.

Commercial support 
While recorded discs are readable in conventional DVD & BD drives, they can only be burned by drives with firmware that supports the slightly higher power mode that M-Disk requires for burning its inorganic layers, as such writing speed is typically 2x speed.

Typically, the M-Discs cost 1.5–3x the price of standard Blu-Ray discs with DVD M-Discs now having sparse availability.

With the first-generation DVD M-DISCs, it was difficult to determine which was the writable side of the disc due to being near fully translucent, until coloring and later labels similar to that on standard DVD discs was added to discs to help distinguish the sides preventing user error.

Asus, LG Electronics, Lite-On, Pioneer, Hitachi-LG and Verbatim produce drives that can record M-DISC media.

Adoption 
The US Utah government has used M-Disk since 2011

Many consumers and avid datahoarders have adopted the format for cold digital data storage.

M-Disc alternatives

Optical 
Syylex Glass Master Disc: Blu-Ray 25GB & Blu-Ray 50GB - Fabricated on demand at the cost of €1000 (EUR) per disc these discs use etched glass and are only typically degradable by physical or chemical damage, but not by normal ageing inside an archival environment.  

Current BD 25GB, BD-DL 50GB & BDXL 100GB (3 Layer) & Sony's BDXL 128GB (4 Layer) discs are rated for up to 50 years (Standard in-organic HTL discs)

Sony's Optical Archive, is an optical competitor to the LTO data tape system, currently with up to 5.5TB cartridges of dual-sided 120mm discs, with desktop readers and automated rackmount standard archival systems allowing for large scale archival and data retrieval rated for an estimated 100+ years.

Magnetic 
Linear Tape-Open (LTO) rated for up to 30 years in a climate-controlled environment and is currently in use by most industries including broadcast, and corporate digital data systems with up to 45 TB (40.92 TiB) of compressed storage per cartrage on LTO's 9th generation.

Hard Disk Drives. currently available in up to 22TB (HDD) and in capacity under the 3.5-inch format and 5TB in the 2.5-inch laptop format, however unlike optical media are limited to 5-25 years of rated operation lifespan rating due to inevitable mechanical failure or magnetic instability.

Solid State 
Solid State Drives currently available in up to 100TB solid state unlike mechanical has relatively limited read/write cycles, and data rot over short periods without power (1 year or more).

Notes 
Accelerated thermal tests are only representative from a materials science perspective, this data is mostly used for manufacturing development, in the real world these discs would never pass 50 °C in real world situations as even basic burial archival depth of 1–2 meters would keep them in the >20 °C range.

Ideal storage condition, e.g., 15 °C and 10% RH

Controlled storage condition, e.g., 25 °C and 50% RH, using the Eyring model

Uncontrolled storage condition, e.g., 30 °C and 80% RH, using the Arrhenius model

References

External links 

 

Audiovisual introductions in 2009
Blu-ray Disc
Digital media
DVD
Rotating disc computer storage media
Optical computer storage media